Yaroslav Vasylyovych Komzyuk (born 21 December 1970 in Lutsk, Ukrainian SSR) is a professional Ukrainian football coach and a former midfielder. He is currently an assistant manager of Volyn Lutsk

References

External links

Flisharovsky, R. Yaroslav Komzyuk: today I still able to play another football game (Ярослав Комзюк: "І сьогодні ще можу відіграти матч"). newspaper "Volyn-nova" at FC Volyn Lutsk. 1 August 2013. 

1970 births
Footballers from Lutsk
Living people
Ukrainian footballers
FC Volyn Lutsk players
FC Polissya Zhytomyr players
FK Liepājas Metalurgs players
FC ODEK Orzhiv players
Ukrainian football managers
FC Volyn Lutsk managers
Ukrainian expatriate footballers
Expatriate footballers in Latvia
Ukrainian expatriate sportspeople in Latvia
Association football midfielders